The Pipizinae is a  subfamily of hoverflies. The subfamily Pipizinae was formerly considered a tribe within Eristalinae, but a phylogenetic analysis published in 2015 suggests it should be ranked as a separate subfamily (Mengual, 2015)

Genera 
Heringia Rondani, 1856
†Oligopipiza Nidergas, Hadrava, Nel et al., 2018 (a fossil genus from Middle Oligocene ~28 MYR-BP)
Pipiza Fallén, 1810
Pipizella Rondani, 1856
Trichopsomyia Williston, 1888
Triglyphus Loew, 1840

References

 
Taxa named by Camillo Rondani
Brachycera subfamilies